The Buila-Vânturarița National Park (national park category II IUCN) is a protected area situated in Romania, in the central-northern part of Vâlcea County, in the administrative territory of the localities Costești, Bărbătești, and Băile Olănești.

Location 
The Buila-Vânturarița National Park is located in the central-northern part of Vâlcea County in the Căpățânii Mountains, a mountain group included in the Parâng Mountains, a subgroup of mountains in the Southern Carpathians.

Description 

Protected areas included in the park: Trovant Museum, Călinești-Brezoi Forest, Valea Cheii Forest, Rădița-Mânzu, Mount Stogu, Arnăuți Cave, Clopot Cave, Munteanu-Murgoci Cave, Pagoda Cave, Valea Bistrița Cave.

 Flora and fauna 
Flora and fauna is diverse, many of the species are protected by international conventions.

 Flora 

Woody plants consist of: English oak (Quercus robur), European beech (Fagus sylvatica), European ash (Fraxinus excelsior), pine (Pinus), Norway spruce (Picea abies), fir (Abies), European yew (Taxus baccata), Scots pine (Pinus sylvestris),  
linden (Tilia), birch (Betula) and species of shrubs: mountain pine (Pinus mugo), savin (Juniperus sabina) or common juniper (Juniperus communis).

Herbs: Edelweiss (Leontopodium alpinum), lady's slipper (Cypripedium calceolus), mountain bellflower (Campanula alpina), yellow monkshood (Aconitum anthora), belladonna (Atropa belladonna), ligularia (Ligularia sibirica), rustyback (Asplenium ceterach), yellow anemone (Anemone ranunculoides), globe-flower (Trollius europaeus), windflower (Anemone nemorosa), martagon (Lilium martagon), centaurea (Centaurea atropurpurea), daphne (Daphne mezereum)

 Fauna 

Species of mammals: deer (Cervus epaphus), brown bear (Ursus arctos), chamois (Rupicapra rupicapra), roe deer (Capreolus capreolus), Eurasian wolf (Canis lupus), wild boar (Sus scrofa), lynx (Lynx lynx), pine marten (Martes martes), squirrel (Sciurus vulgaris), badger (Meles meles), barbastelle (Barrbastella barbastellus), lesser mouse-eared bat (Myotis blythii), brown long-eared bat (Plecotus auritus);

Species of birds: western capercaillie (Tetrao urogallus), white-crowned wheatear (Oenanthe leucopyga), red kite (Milvus milvus), red-footed falcon (Falco vespertinus), white wagtail (Motacilla alba), European nightjar (Caprimulgus europaeus), rock bunting (Emberiza cia), lesser spotted eagle (Aquila pomarina), wallcreeper (Tichodroma muraria), hoopoe (Upupa epops), 
 
Reptiles, amphibians and frogs: green lizard (Lacerta viridis), common European adder (Vipera berus), smooth snake (Coronella austriaca), fire salamander (Salamandra salamandra), alpine newt (Triturus alpestris), common toad (Bufo bufo), yellow-bellied toad (Bombina variegata) or common frog (Rana temporaria'').

Access 
 European route E81 București – Corbii Mari – Piteşti – Morărești – Râmnicu Vâlcea – national road DN64 –  Vlăduceni – Valea Cheii – county road DJ654 – Cheia
 National road (DN7) Sibiu – Tălmaciu – Câinenii Mari – Călinești – national road DN7A – Brezoi – Brădișor Lake.

Gallery

See also 
 Cozia National Park
 Protected areas of Romania

References

External links 
  Buila-Vânturarița Natural Park

National parks of Romania
Geography of Vâlcea County
Protected areas established in 2005
Tourist attractions in Vâlcea County
2005 establishments in Romania